The 2004 Southern Conference men's basketball tournament took place from March 3–6, 2004 at the North Charleston Coliseum in North Charleston, South Carolina. The East Tennessee State Buccaneers defeated their in-state rival Chattanooga in the championship game to win their sixth title in school history and receive the automatic berth to the 2004 NCAA tournament. Tim Smith of ETSU was named the tournament's Most Valuable Player.

Format
All twelve teams were eligible for the tournament. The tournament used a preset bracket consisting of four rounds, the first of which featured four games, with the winners moving on to the quarterfinal round. The top two finishers in each division received first round byes, and the division winners were seeded first and second overall.

Bracket

* Overtime game

See also
List of Southern Conference men's basketball champions

References

Tournament
Southern Conference men's basketball tournament
Southern Conference men's basketball tournament
Southern Conference men's basketball tournament